George Masters (4 July 1884 – 1 July 1962) was a British gymnast. He competed in the men's team all-around event at the 1920 Summer Olympics.

References

1884 births
1962 deaths
British male artistic gymnasts
Olympic gymnasts of Great Britain
Gymnasts at the 1920 Summer Olympics
Sportspeople from London